The 1982 NAIA Division II football season, as part of the 1982 college football season in the United States and the 27th season of college football sponsored by the NAIA, was the 13th season of play of the NAIA's lower division for football.

The season was played from August to November 1982 and culminated in the 1982 NAIA Division II Football National Championship, played at Maxwell Field on the campus of Linfield College in McMinnville, Oregon.

Linfield defeated William Jewell in the championship game, 33–15, to win their first NAIA national title.

Conference standings

Conference champions

Postseason

See also
 1982 NAIA Division I football season
 1982 NCAA Division I-A football season
 1982 NCAA Division I-AA football season
 1982 NCAA Division II football season
 1982 NCAA Division III football season

References

 
NAIA Football National Championship